Losee may refer to:
William Losee (1757–1832), preacher
Stephanie Losee (born 1965), American author, journalist, and cultural critic

See also
 Losie (disambiguation)
 Losey, a surname